Richard Daniel Brehaut (born June 10, 1991) is a former college football quarterback. He played college football at UCLA.

Brehaut played high school football and baseball at Los Osos High School in Rancho Cucamonga, California, where he was a member of PrepStar Dream Team (No. 15 prospect) and SuperPrep All-American. He was rated as a top ten quarterback by rivals.com, scout.com, and by ESPNU. Brehaut was named to the CIF-Southern Section Central Division first team.

In baseball, Brehaut received team MVP honors and served as captain for two years.

Brehaut has one sister. Wakeboarding and playing video games are hobbies he has listed.

College career
He played his first college game against the San Diego State on September 5, 2009 in the Rose Bowl, where he completed two passes for 39 yards.

On October 2, 2010, Brehaut played in place of injured Kevin Prince and made 12 of 23 passes for 128 yards in his first career start. He led the Bruins to a 42–28 victory over the Washington State Cougars at home. Brehaut had a 1-yard run touchdown in the fourth quarter.

On November 26, 2010, Brehaut was 33-for-56 for 321 yards and three touchdowns, while running another score in on the ground against Arizona State University. During this outing he also broke Troy Aikman's school record for passing attempts and completions, though it has since been broken by Mike Fafaul.

In 2011, Brehaut joined the UCLA baseball team as a catcher. During the football season in the October game against Washington State at the Rose Bowl, he broke his left leg while running with the ball in the second quarter. Prior to this game, he started four of the Bruins’ first six games, passing for 907 yards and six touchdowns without an interception.

See also

2009 UCLA Bruins football team
2010 UCLA Bruins football team

References

1991 births
Living people
People from Upland, California
People from Rancho Cucamonga, California
Players of American football from California
Sportspeople from San Bernardino County, California
American football quarterbacks
Under Armour All-American football players
UCLA Bruins football players